"Protection" is a collaboration between English trip hop collective Massive Attack and Tracey Thorn from English duo Everything but the Girl, that appears on Massive Attack's second studio album, Protection (1994). Released as a single on 9 January 1995, the song reached number 14 on the UK Singles Chart, staying in the chart for four weeks, and also peaked at number 27 in New Zealand. The song was also included on Everything but the Girl's compilation The Best of and Like the Deserts Miss the Rain.

The song contains samples taken from "The Payback" by James Brown, namely the hi-hat/bass figure that drives the beat and the recurrent wah-wah guitar chord.

Critical reception
Larry Flick from Billboard viewed the song as "gorgeous". Linda Ryan from the Gavin Report wrote, "Produced by Soul II Soul's Nellee Hooper (who also did Björk's album, Debut), "Protection" is a slow groove to paradise. I mean, this one is smooooth! Everything but the Girl's Tracey Thorn handles the vocals on this one, and she really shines." Caroline Sullivan from The Guardian felt that the "normally limpid" singer "shows torchy sensuality" on the song. Chuck Campbell from Knoxville News Sentinel viewed it as "supple", naming it the album's "highlight". 

In his weekly UK chart commentary, James Masterton complimented the "velvet tones" of Thorn, stating that "the result is an instant Top 20 smash, just one place short of the peak originally reached by their groundbreaking debut hit "Unfinished Sympathy"." James Hamilton from Music Weeks RM Dance Update described the song as "an attractive gentle atmospheric R&B swayer". Parry Gettelman from Orlando Sentinel felt the singer is "a cool, elegantly melancholy presence". Barry Walters for Spin constated, "The eight pained minutes of the title track are alone worth the price of the CD, despite suggesting that an Everything but the Girl remix album might have been the way to go."

Music video
A music video was produced to promote the single, directed by French film director, screenwriter, and producer Michel Gondry. It was later published on Massive Attack's official YouTube channel in March 2009, and had generated more than 16 million views as of January 2023.

Track listings

 UK CD single 1 "Protection" (7" edit)
 "Protection" (The Eno Mix)
 "Protection" (Radiation for the Nation Mix)
 "Protection" (J Sw!ft Mix)

 UK CD single 2 "Protection"
 "Protection" (Underdog's Angel Dust Mix)
 "Three" (Dom T's House of Fortune Mix)

 UK 12-inch single "Protection" (Underdog's Angel Dust Mix)
 "Protection" (Radiation for the Nation Mix)
 "Protection" (The Eno Mix)
 "Protection" (J Sw!ft Mix)
 "Protection" (album version)

 UK 2×12-inch single "Protection" (The Eno Mix)
 "Protection" (The Eno Instrumental)
 "Protection" (Underdog's Angel Dust Mix)
 "Protection" (Angel Dust Instrumental)
 "Three" (Dom T's House of Fortune Mix)
 "Protection" (Radiation for the Nation Mix)
 "Protection" (album version)
 "Protection" (J Sw!ft Mix)

 US CD single'
 "Protection" (album version) – 7:51
 "Protection" (single edit) – 4:53
 "Protection" (The Eno Mix) – 9:10
 "Protection" (J Sw!ft Mix) – 7:12
 "Three" (Dom T's House of Fortune Mix) – 7:16

Charts

References

External links
 

1994 songs
1995 singles
Massive Attack songs
Music videos directed by Michel Gondry
Song recordings produced by Nellee Hooper
Songs written by Andrew Vowles
Songs written by Daddy G
Songs written by Robert Del Naja
Songs written by Tracey Thorn
Tracey Thorn songs
Virgin Records singles